Arville is a former commune in the Loir-et-Cher department in central France. On 1 January 2018, it was merged into the new commune of Couëtron-au-Perche.

Sights
Arville's 12th-Century commandry now hosts a museum on the Crusades and the Knights Templar.

Population

See also
Communes of the Loir-et-Cher department

References

External links
 The Commandry Official site

Former communes of Loir-et-Cher
Populated places disestablished in 2018